Ceratocephale is a genus of polychaetes belonging to the family Nereididae.

The species of this genus inhabit marine and brackish environments.

Species 
Species in this genus include:
 Ceratocephale abyssorum (Hartman & Fauchald, 1971) 
 Ceratocephale andaman Hylleberg & Natewathana, 1988

References

Polychaetes